Sarsaz (Harıhaź) is a rural locality (a village) in Teplyakovsky Selsoviet, Burayevsky District, Bashkortostan, Russia. The population was 46 as of 2010. There is 1 street.

Geography 
Sarsaz is located 33 km north of Burayevo (the district's administrative centre) by road. Bayshady is the nearest rural locality.

References 

Rural localities in Burayevsky District